Penguins & Friends: Hey! That's My Fish! was a WiiWare video game based on the board game "Hey! That's My Fish!". It was developed by the Spanish developer Gammick Entertainment and has been delisted from the WiiWare service on March 30, 2012.

The game involves players taking turns to move across a field of hexagons as they collect as much fish as they can.

References

External links
 Nintendolife Penguins & Friends page
 Gammick Entertainment official website

2009 video games
Gammick Entertainment games
Multiplayer and single-player video games
Penguins in popular culture
Video games based on board games
Video games developed in Spain
Wii games
Wii-only games
WiiWare games